The Valley Leadership Academy (formerly Fearns Community Sports College) is an 11–16 co-educational secondary school with academy status in Stacksteads, Bacup, Lancashire, England. It was formerly a community school and adopted its present name after becoming an academy in July 2019. It is part of Star Academies.

School inspections 

In June 2014, the school was placed in special measures, after being rated 'inadequate' in every category of the latest OFSTED report. The inspectors stated that "marking is ‘inconsistent’, pupil attendance is poor and senior leaders and governors have failed to improve the quality of teaching and raise achievement since the last ‘satisfactory’ inspection in June 2012".

Notable formerpupils 
 Matty James, professional footballer
 Reece James, professional footballer

References

External links 
 

Star Academies
Schools in the Borough of Rossendale
Secondary schools in Lancashire
Academies in Lancashire